Salt Cay is the second largest of the Turks Islands, one of the two island groups forming of the British territory of the Turks and Caicos Islands in the Caribbean. The population is 108 (est. 2012), all in the district capital Balfour Town, established in 1673, on the west coast.

It was once home to several hundred people, all supported by the salt industry.

Salt Cay is accessible via plane; Caicos Express Airways flies there from both Providenciales and Grand Turk islands. From Grand Turk there is also a "community ferry", which operates three times a week and takes about one hour to cover the  distance.

History
When the Spanish conquistador-explorer Juan Ponce de León came to the Islands in 1512, they were still inhabited by Arawak Indians who disappeared afterwards due to the diseases contracted from the Europeans and forced labour imposed by them.

Bermudians came to the islands in 1673 fleeing slavery and established what was to become the principal industry for the next 300 years – the production of salt from brine. The islands came under British colonial rule in 1766.

It was Turks and Caicos salt that George Washington needed to preserve the food for his army during the American Revolutionary War and that the Canadian and American fishing fleets used to salt down their catches.

A combination of competition, costs, mismanagement and the lack of a deepwater harbour brought the salt industry in the Turks and Caicos Islands to an end. As late as the 1920s and 1930s, up to half a dozen sailing ships at a time would be anchored off Salt Cay awaiting cargo. The salt had to be ferried out to them over shallow water. Bahama Passage, a 1941 film, showed the salt industry in its final days.

Ruins from the salt operations remain on Salt Cay. The island is now popular with tourists looking for uncrowded beaches and activities like whale-watching. Scuba diving and other water sports also attract visitors. Donkeys and cattle, descendants of those worked during the salt days, roam freely.

On 7 September 2017, Hurricane Irma struck the Turks and Caicos, damaging 100% of the housing on Salt Cay.

Facilities
Three small restaurants specialising in fresh seafood exist on the island. The grocery options consist of three variety shops and three gift shops.

Humpback whales of Salt Cay

The humpback whales of Salt Cay, Turks and Caicos Islands and Silver Bank are North Atlantic humpback whales, and are some of the same individuals one might encounter on a whale watching cruise off of Massachusetts' Stellwagan Bank, the coast of Maine, and further north into the waters of Iceland and Greenland, Newfoundland and the Gulf of Saint Lawrence.

Salt Cay, Turks and Caicos Islands is in the middle of the humpback whales' annual migratory route to the Silver Banks, a humpback mating and nursery area, north of the Dominican Republic in the Caribbean Sea. It is a  shallow coral reef area, an underwater plateau of limestone. It is believed that the whales choose this area for birthing and nursing because of the numerous coral heads which break the surface providing protection from ocean swells. Some estimates show 3,000–5,000 humpback whales passing through the waters of the Silver Banks between December and mid-April each year, making it the largest breeding and calving grounds, often called a nursery, in the world.

Humpback whales born in the waters around Great Sand Cay and their mothers, as well as other humpback whales, are often spotted both by passengers on boats and from the shores of Salt Cay.

References

Humpback Whales Migration
Turks and Caicos history

Turks Islands